Jimmy's Winnin' Matches is an hour-long documentary which followed the success of the Donegal senior football team that won the 2012 All-Ireland Senior Football Championship Final under the guidance of Jim McGuinness. It take its name from "Jimmy's Winning Matches", the anthem of Donegal's 2012 Championship success.

It first aired on RTÉ One on 3 January 2013 at 9.35 pm. Coco Television were responsible for putting it together.

The documentary featured an exclusive interview with McGuinness filmed at his Glenties home, while Rory Gallagher, who penned the famous song, also featured, with Alan Foley doing the research.

References

Documentary
2012 in Gaelic football
2013 in Irish television
Documentary films about Gaelic games
Documentary films about sportspeople
Donegal county football team
Gaelic games on television
Irish documentary television films
Sports television in Ireland